Vladimir Ivanovich Timochkin (22 December 1936 – 9 January 2023) was a Soviet-Russian mechanic and politician. He served on the Supreme Soviet of the Soviet Union from 1979 to 1989.

Timochkin died in Berezniki on 9 January 2023 at the age of 86.

References

1936 births
2023 deaths
Soviet politicians
Members of the Supreme Soviet of the Soviet Union
People from Sverdlovsk Oblast